Radovan Krivokapić (Serbian Cyrillic: Радован Кривокапић; born 14 August 1978) is a Serbian former professional footballer who played as an attacking midfielder.

Managerial statistics

Honours
Red Star Belgrade
 First League of Serbia and Montenegro: 2003–04, 2005–06
 Serbia and Montenegro Cup: 2003–04, 2005–06

References

External links
 
 

Association football midfielders
Cypriot First Division players
Enosis Neon Paralimni FC players
Expatriate footballers in Cyprus
Expatriate footballers in Greece
First League of Serbia and Montenegro players
FK TSC Bačka Topola players
OFK Bečej 1918 players
FK Radnički 1923 players
FK Vojvodina players
Football League (Greece) players
Iraklis Thessaloniki F.C. players
People from Bačka Topola
Red Star Belgrade footballers
Serbia and Montenegro international footballers
Serbia and Montenegro under-21 international footballers
Serbian expatriate footballers
Serbian expatriate sportspeople in Cyprus
Serbian expatriate sportspeople in Greece
Serbian footballers
Serbian people of Montenegrin descent
Serbian SuperLiga players
Super League Greece players
Veria F.C. players
1978 births
Living people
Serbia and Montenegro footballers